Tolar, New Mexico (pronounced TOL-er) is a ghost town in the panhandle of northern Roosevelt County that existed in the 20th century.  The site is at the intersection of New Mexico State Road 86 and U.S. Routes 60 and 84 between Fort Sumner in De Baca County and Melrose in Curry County.  Tolar was established as a stop on the Belen Cutoff of the Santa Fe Railway in 1907.  A train carrying munitions exploded there in 1944, causing the largest accidental explosion in New Mexico history.

Origin
The first settler in the vicinity of Tolar was Alvin Ellender Jeter, who applied for a patent on 160 acres of land under the Homestead Act in 1901.  Jeter found abundant groundwater there and built a half-dugout house.  His daughter Marvie Ellen Jeter, born July 9, 1903, was the first child born at Tolar.  The Jeter family moved to Haskell, Texas in 1917.

To bypass the steep grades on its line through the Raton and Glorieta Passes, the Santa Fe Railway in 1903 began work on the Belen Cutoff across East Central New Mexico, building a new line eastward from Belen through the Abo Pass to Texico on the state line with Texas.  Much sand and gravel for construction of the railroad came from the vicinity of Tolar.  A race riot broke out in 1905 amongst the construction workers and railroad men that led to eight deaths; supposedly, the bodies were buried in fill at Tolar.  The cutoff was finished in December 1907.

While still a tent city, the United States Post Office Department opened a post office at Tolar on August 18, 1905.  J.W. Coleman, the first postmaster, named the town for Tolar, Texas, where his daughter lived.  In 1908, the town was platted.  By 1911, 600 people lived there.  Tolar had a school until 1926, when it was consolidated with one in Taiban.  The railroad station closed in March 1933.  The population fell to 350 by 1941 and under 300 in 1944.

1944 explosion
Midday on November 30, 1944, an eighty-one-car west-bound mixed freight train derailed after a hot box on the seventh car of the train led to its axle breaking. The train carried airplane engines, canned corned beef, mattresses, fuel oil, and 165 five-hundred pound bombs bound for the Pacific Theatre. Thirty-six cars derailed.  The oil car caught fire.  After burning for twenty to thirty minutes, the munitions exploded.  The explosion dug a crater 75 feet wide and 10 feet deep.  Most of the buildings in Tolar were destroyed, including the post office, the railroad station, and the grocery.  The blast was felt 120 miles away in Hereford, Texas.  Thirty miles to the southeast in Elida, dishes fell from their shelves and windows broke in Melrose, twelve miles to the east.   One person was killed, Tolar resident Jess Brown, who was struck in the head by a piece of metal and died while being transported to the hospital in Melrose.  His widow, Pauline Brown, received a $17,500 settlement from the railroad for his death.  Because of the war, the Federal Bureau of Investigation sent Special Agent R.J. Untreiner to investigate.  The Bureau found no signs of sabotage and that it was an accident.  While The New York Times reported only a single paragraph about the accident, it was front-page news in New Mexico newspapers.  Because of that news coverage, officials of the Manhattan Project issued a cover story of an ammunition explosion on the Alamogordo Air Force Base on July 16, 1945, after the test of the first atomic bomb.

Tolar Today

While the town had been declining for years, the explosion hastened its demise.  The post office was closed April 5, 1946, mail being redirected to the Taiban post office.  Today, there is nothing left of the community as Tolar “is only a wide spot” on the highway.

Two locomotives and five freight cars of a BNSF Railroad freight train derailed at Tolar on September 21, 1997.

On November 21, 2014, the New Mexico Department of Transportation dedicated a historical marker at Tolar ahead of the seventieth anniversary of the munitions explosion.  The historical marker is at Mile Marker 344 on U.S. Routes 60 and 84, two miles east of the site of Tolar.

The site of Tolar is in the Portales Micropolitan Statistical Area, which is part of the larger Clovis-Portales Combined Statistical Area.

References

Bibliography

Lillian Bowe, "Story of blast memorialized by marker," Portales News-Tribune, October 29, 2014.
Dixie Boyle, A History of Highway 60 & the Belen Cutoff: A Brief History.  Parker, Colorado:  Outskirts Press, 2010.  
"Derailed Train Blocks Track West of Clovis," Albuquerque Journal, September 23, 1997, p. C1.  
Francis L. & Roberta B. Fugate.  Roadside History of New Mexico.  Missoula, Montana:  Mountain Press Publishing, 1989.  .
Robert Julyan, The Place Names of New Mexico.  Albuquerque:  University of New Mexico Press, 1996.  .
David F. Myrick, New Mexico’s Railroads:  A Historical Survey.  Rev. ed.  Albuquerque:  University of New Mexico Press, 1990.  .
Temple Padon, “Rural Development in the Homestead Period,” in Roosevelt County History and Heritage, ed. by Jean M. Burroughs.   Portales, N.M.:  Bishop Printing, 1975.  
Keith Payne, “Town and Rural Post Offices,” in Roosevelt County History and Heritage, ed. by Jean M. Burroughs.  Portales, N.M.:  Bishop Printing, 1975.  
William Penner, Shawn Kelley & Nicholas Parker, Ho! To the Land of Sunshine: A History of the Belen Cutoff.  Albuquerque:  P3 Planning, 2013.  
Wendel Sloan, “Tolar Before the Explosion,” New Mexico Magazine, October 1987, pp. 72–73.  
Alabam Sumner, "One Death from Tolar Blast:  War Brought Closer Home When Explosion Occurs," Clovis News-Journal, December 1, 1944, p. 1.
Ferenc M. Szasz, “The Tolar, New Mexico, Munitions Train Explosion,” Larger than Life:  New Mexico in the Twentieth Century, Albuquerque:  University of New Mexico Press, 2006.  .
United Press, “Car of Bombs Explodes,” The New York Times, December 1, 1944, at 25.  

Geography of Roosevelt County, New Mexico
Ghost towns in New Mexico
History of Roosevelt County, New Mexico
1905 establishments in New Mexico Territory
Disasters in New Mexico
1944 fires in the United States
1944 disasters in the United States
Explosions in 1944
Explosions in the United States
Train and rapid transit fires
Accidents and incidents involving Atchison, Topeka and Santa Fe Railway
Railway accidents and incidents in New Mexico
Derailments in the United States